Jean de Croutte de Saint Martin (16 September 1932 – 7 May 2015) was a French equestrian. He competed in two events at the 1964 Summer Olympics.

References

1932 births
2015 deaths
French male equestrians
Olympic equestrians of France
Equestrians at the 1964 Summer Olympics
Place of birth missing